Jay Webber Seaver (March 9, 1855 – May 5, 1915 ) was an American physician and a pioneer of anthropometry.

Life 
Seaver was born in Craftsbury, Vermont as son of William Seaver and Betsy Urie, and had four siblings. He studied at the Yale School of Medicine, where he became professor in his later life. Seaver measured the bodies of thousands of people attending the summer school resort at Chautauqua, New York., and published the results of his studies in his work Anthropometry and physical examination. A book for practical use in connection with gymnastic work and physical education.. On July 1, 1886, he married Leona Nancy Sheldon Sullivan.

Seaver died in Berkeley, California, and was buried at Chautauqua Cemetery on the main road to Jamestown.

Honors and awards
Honorary Fellow in Memoriam, National Academy of Kinesiology

References 

1855 births
1915 deaths
19th-century American physicians
Yale School of Medicine alumni
Yale School of Medicine faculty
Anthropometry
People from Craftsbury, Vermont